The Atlanta Blaze were a professional men's field lacrosse team in Major League Lacrosse (MLL). The Blaze became the ninth team in MLL as an expansion team for the 2016 season and played its home games at Atlanta Silverbacks Park in Atlanta, Georgia.

Franchise history

On August 7, 2015, the MLL granted an expansion franchise to Atlanta, Georgia for the 2016 MLL season. The league had previously held several games there before including the 2014 and 2015 championship games which drew 8,149 and 8,674 people (the latter is a Steinfeld Cup record). The league suspended the Blaze for the 2020 season.

2016 inaugural season
The Blaze hosted the first game in franchise history on Saturday, April 23, 2016 against the storied Chesapeake Bayhawks. Kevin Rice scored the first goal in franchise history only 44 seconds into the game, and Conrad Oberbeck scored 14 seconds later as Atlanta took a 6-0 lead to start the game. Despite the great start, the Blaze were not able to finish it out and lost 16-13 in front of 4,145 fans. After losing in Boston, the Blaze came back home on May 14 where they smoked the Denver Outlaws for their first win in franchise history by a score of 23-12.

The rest of the Blaze's first year included some very questionable moves. On June 14, the Blaze traded their top draft pick, Myles Jones, to the Bayhawks after Jones had only played two games for the Blaze. On July 21, the team released Hall of Fame head coach John Tucker and replaced him with assistant coach David Huntley after a 3-7 start. The Blaze finished their inaugural season in eighth place at 4-10, ahead of only the Florida Launch. Former Atlanta Hawks and Thrashers executive Jim Pfeifer was named the team's new president on December 29.

2017 season
In 2017, the Blaze returned much more competitive. The team still had playoff hopes as they entered the second-to-last week of the regular season, but a loss to the Rochester Rattlers eliminated them. However, they were still able to post an improved 6-8 record. Highlights from the season included a 17-4 drubbing of the Florida Launch on July 1, playing in their first Fourth of July game in Denver, and Kevin Rice becoming the first Atlanta Blaze player to score 100 points in a Blaze uniform.

On December 18, 2017, Blaze coach Dave Huntley died at the age of 60. Former MLL player Liam Banks was named the Blaze's third head coach.

Before the 2018 Collegiate Draft on April 18, MLL commissioner Sandy Brown announced the league had approved the sale of the Blaze to Andre Gudger, founder and CEO of technology and investment company Eccalon. This came five months after former owner Peter Trematerra sold the team back to the league, a move that also included a lawsuit.

2018 season
The 2018 summer season was the best season that the Blaze had since their inception, posting a 7-7 record. They were one win away from their first playoff berth, but lost to the Denver Outlaws on the final week of the season to be eliminated.

2019 season and dissolution
During this season they had to move to Atlanta Silverbacks Park because their Grady Stadium was being renovated.

After, they ceased operations and were relocated to Philadelphia as the second incarnation of the Philadelphia Barrage.

Attendance
Despite drawing near sellouts for the 2014 and 2015 Steinfeld Cup championship games, the Blaze have so far failed to draw similar numbers for their home games.

Season-by-season

Head coaches

Roster

MLL award winners

Rookie of the Year
 Alex Woodall: 2019

Defensive Player of the Year
 Liam Byrnes: 2019

David Huntley Man of the Year
 Scott Ratliff: 2018

Draft history

References

External links

majorleaguelacrosse.com

 
Lacrosse clubs established in 2015
2015 establishments in Georgia (U.S. state)
Blaze